The Siegfried Line, known in German as the Westwall, was a German defensive line built during the 1930s (started 1936) opposite the French Maginot Line. The line featured more than 18,000 bunkers, tunnels and tank traps.

From September 1944 to March 1945 the Siegfried Line was subjected to a large-scale Allied offensive.

Name 
The official name for the German defensive line construction program before and during the Second World War that collectively came to be known as the "Westwall" (and "Siegfried Line", or sometimes "West Wall", in English) changed several times during the late 1930s reflecting areas of progress.

 Border Watch programme (pioneering programme) for the most advanced positions (1938)
 Limes Programme (1938)
 Western Air Defense Zone (1938)
 Aachen–Saar Programme (1939)
 Geldern Emplacement between Brüggen and Kleve (1939–1940)

These programmes were all pushed forward with the highest priority, putting a heavy demand on the available resources.

The origin of the name "Westwall" is unknown, but it appeared in popular use from the middle of 1939; there is a record of Hitler sending an Order of the Day to the soldiers and the workers at the "Westwall" on 20 May 1939.

History

Minor early role 
The Siegfried Line at the start of the Second World War had serious weaknesses. German General Alfred Jodl said after the war that it was "little better than a building site in 1939", and when Field Marshal Gerd von Rundstedt inspected the line, the weak construction and insufficient weapons caused him to laugh. Despite France's declaration of war on Germany at the beginning of the Second World War, there was no major combat at the Siegfried Line at the start of the campaign in the west, except for a minor offensive by the French. Instead, both sides remained stuck in the so-called Phoney War, where neither side attacked the other and both stayed in their safe positions.

The Reich Ministry of Public Enlightenment and Propaganda drew foreign attention to the unfinished Westwall, in several instances showcasing incomplete or test positions to portray the project finished and ready for action. During the Battle of France, French forces made minor attacks against some parts of the line, but the majority was left untested. When the campaign finished, transportable weapons and materials (metal doors for instance) were removed from the Siegfried Line and used in other places such as the Atlantic Wall defences.  The concrete sections were left in place in the countryside and soon became completely unfit for defense.  The bunkers were instead used for storage.

Reactivation in 1944 

With the D-Day landings in Normandy on 6 June 1944, war in the west broke out once more. On 24 August 1944, Hitler gave a directive for renewed construction on the Siegfried Line. 20,000 forced labourers and members of the Reichsarbeitsdienst (Reich Labour Service), most of whom were 14–16-year-old boys, attempted to re-equip the line for defence purposes. Local people were also called in to carry out this kind of work, mostly building anti-tank ditches.

Even during construction, it was becoming clear that the bunkers could not withstand the newly developed armour-piercing weapons. At the same time as the reactivation of the Siegfried Line, small concrete "Tobruks" were built along the borders of the occupied area. These bunkers were mostly dugouts for single soldiers.

Clashes 

The Aachen Gap was the logical route into Germany's Rhineland and a main industrial area, and was therefore where the Germans concentrated their defence.

The Americans committed an estimated 120,000 troops plus reinforcements to the Battle of Hürtgen Forest. The battle in this heavily forested area claimed the lives of 24,000 American soldiers plus 9,000 so-called nonbattle casualties—those evacuated because of fatigue, exposure, accidents and disease. The German death toll is not documented. After the Battle of Hürtgen Forest, the Battle of the Bulge began, starting in the area south of the Hürtgenwald, between Monschau and the Luxembourgish town of Echternach. This offensive was a last-ditch attempt by the Germans to reverse the course of the war in the West. German loss of life and material was severe and the effort failed. There were serious clashes along other parts of the Siegfried Line and soldiers in many bunkers refused to surrender, often fighting to the death. By early 1945 the last Siegfried Line bunkers had fallen at the Saar and Hunsrück.

The British 21st Army Group also attacked the Siegfried Line. This army group included US formations and the resulting fighting brought total US losses to approximately 68,000. In addition, the First Army incurred over 50,000 non-battle casualties and the Ninth Army over 20,000. This brings the overall cost of the Siegfried Line Campaign, in US personnel, close to 140,000.

Postwar period 

During the postwar period, many sections of the Siegfried Line were removed using explosives.

Preservation and destruction 
In North Rhine Westphalia, about thirty bunkers still remain; most of the rest were either destroyed with explosives or covered with earth. Tank traps still exist in many areas; in the Eifel, they run over several kilometres. Zweibrücken Air Base was built on top of the Siegfried Line. When the base was still open, the remnants of several old bunkers could be seen in the tree line near the base's main gate. Another bunker was outside the base perimeter fence near the base hospital. Once the base was closed, workers, digging up the base's fuel tanks, discovered lost bunkers buried below the tanks.

Since 1997, with the motto "The value of the unpleasant as a memorial" (Der Denkmalswert des Unerfreulichen), an effort has been made to preserve the remains of the Siegfried Line as a historical monument. This was intended to stop reactionary fascist groups from using the Siegfried Line for propaganda purposes.

At the same time, state funding was still being provided to destroy the remains of the Siegfried Line. For this reason, emergency archaeological digs took place whenever any part of the line was removed, for example for road building. Archaeological activity was not able to stop the destruction of these sections but furthered scientific knowledge and revealed details of the line's construction.

Environmental conservation 
Nature conservationists consider the remains of the Siegfried Line valuable as a chain of biotopes where, thanks to its size, rare animals and plants can take refuge and reproduce. This effect is magnified because the concrete ruins cannot be used for agricultural or forestry purposes.

Westwall construction programmes

Border Watch 
Sleeping accommodations were hammocks. In exposed positions, similar small bunkers were erected with small round armoured "lookout" sections on the roofs. The programme was carried out by the Border Watch (Grenzwacht), a small military troop activated in the Rhineland immediately after the region was re-militarised by Germany after having been de-militarised following the First World War.

Limes 

The Limes Programme began in 1938 following an order by Hitler to strengthen fortifications on the western German border. Limes refers to the former borders of the Roman Empire; the cover story for the programme was that it was an archaeological study.

Its Type 10 bunkers were more strongly constructed than the earlier border fortifications. A total of 3,471 were built along the entire length of the Siegfried Line. They featured a central room or shelter for 10–12 men with a stepped embrasure facing backwards and a combat section  higher. This elevated section had embrasures at the front and sides for machine guns. More embrasures were provided for riflemen, and the entire structure was constructed so as to be safe against poison gas.

Heating was from a safety oven, the chimney of which was covered with a thick grating. Surviving examples still retain signs warning "Walls have ears" and "Lights out when embrasures are open!"

Aachen-Saar 
One difference was that there were no embrasures at the front, only at the sides of the bunkers. Embrasures were only built at the front in special cases and were then protected with heavy metal doors. This construction phase included the towns of Aachen and Saarbrücken, which were initially west of the Limes Programme defence line.

Western Air Defence Zone 
The Western Air Defence Zone (Luftverteidigungszone West or LVZ West) continued parallel to the two other lines toward the east, and consisted mainly of concrete flak foundations. Scattered MG 42 and MG 34 emplacements added additional defence against both air and land targets. Flak turrets were designed to force enemy planes to fly higher, thus decreasing the accuracy of their bombing. These towers were protected at close range by bunkers from the Limes and Aachen-Saar programmes.

Geldern Emplacement 

The Geldern Emplacement lengthened the Siegfried Line northwards as far as Kleve on the Rhine, and was built after the start of the Second World War. The Siegfried Line originally ended in the north near Brüggen in the Viersen district. The primary constructions were unarmed dugouts, but their extremely strong concrete design afforded excellent protection to the occupants. For camouflage they were often built near farms.

Elements 
Standard construction elements such as large Regelbau bunkers, smaller concrete "pillboxes", and "dragon's teeth" anti-tank obstacles were built as part of each construction phase, sometimes by the thousands. Frequently vertical steel rods would be interspersed between the teeth.  This standardisation was the most effective use of scarce raw materials, transport and workers, but proved an ineffective tank barrier as US bulldozers simply pushed dirt bridges over these devices.

"Dragon's teeth" tank traps were also known as Höcker in German ('humps' or 'pimples' in English) because of their shape. These blocks of reinforced concrete stand in several rows on a single foundation. There are two typical sorts of barrier: Type 1938 with four rows of teeth getting higher toward the back, and Type 1939 with five rows of such teeth. Many other irregular lines of teeth were also built. Another design of tank obstacle, known as the Czech hedgehog, was made by welding together several bars of steel in such a way that any tank rolling over it would get stuck and possibly damaged. If the contour of the land allowed it, water-filled ditches were dug instead of tank traps. Examples of this kind of defence are those north of Aachen near Geilenkirchen.

Working conditions 
The early fortifications were mostly built by private firms, but the private sector was unable to provide the number of workers needed for the programmes that followed; this gap was filled by the Todt Organisation. With this organisation's help, huge numbers of forced labourers – up to 500,000 at a time – worked on the Siegfried Line. Transport of materials and workers from all across Germany was managed by the Deutsche Reichsbahn railway company, which took advantage of the well-developed strategic railway lines built on Germany's western border in World War I.

Working conditions were highly dangerous.

Life on the building site and after work was monotonous, and many people gave up and left. Most workers received the West Wall Medal for their service.

In propaganda 
German propaganda, both at home and abroad, repeatedly portrayed the Westwall during its construction as an unbreachable bulwark. At the start of the war, the opposing troops remained behind their own defence lines.

As a morale booster for British troops marching off to France, the Siegfried Line was the subject of a popular song: "We're Going to Hang out the Washing on the Siegfried Line".
A French version by Ray Ventura ("On ira pendre notre linge sur la ligne Siegfried") met a great success during the Phoney War (Drôle de guerre).

When asked about the Siegfried Line, General George S. Patton reportedly said "Fixed fortifications are monuments to man's stupidity."

See also

Similar border fortifications 
 Atlantic Wall
Linea P (Spain)
 Maginot line
 Międzyrzecz Fortified Region
 Czechoslovak border fortifications
 Alpine Wall
 National Redoubt (Switzerland)
 Mannerheim Line

Surviving elements 
 List of surviving elements of the Siegfried Line
 Besseringen B-Werk, museum in a preserved bunker complex
 Orscholz Switch (aka Siegfried Switch), part of Siegfried Line and scene of heavy fighting between German and US troops
 Regelbau, standard bunker construction
 Siegfried Line Museum, Pirmasens

References

Further reading 
 
 Kauffmann, J.E. and Jurga, Robert M. Fortress Europe: European Fortifications of World War II, Da Capo Press, 2002. 
  – full text

External links 

 BunkerBlog: All about German fortifications 1933–1945
 Bunkersite.com: About bunkers built by the Germans during 1933–1945 in the whole of Europe
 http://www.westwallmuseum-irrel.de/
 German Doctrine of the Stabilized Front, Report by US Military Intelligence Division, August 1943
 Bunkers in Europe (include: Siegfried Line)
 Pillbox Warfare in the Siegfried Line
  Storming Simserhof near Bitche – 1944
 »You enter Germany: Bloody Huertgen and the Siegfried Line« – Documentary by Achim Konejung and Aribert Weis; 2007
 Der Weltkrieg war vor deiner Tuer – The little Siegfried line (German: WMTS Wetterau-Main-Tauber-Stellung) in the east of the Siegfried line
 

 
German World War II defensive lines
Historic defensive lines
Military installations of the Wehrmacht
World War II sites in Germany
Rhine Province